Transmission IV is the fourth and final Transmission information service release (only available to subscribers) by British progressive rock band Porcupine Tree. It contains a complete improvisation of what would become the song "Moonloop", included on the 1995 release The Sky Moves Sideways.

The 2006 reissue is an exact reproduction of the originally issued fan club edition, which was released 2001 and was limited to 500 copies. The reissue has also been remastered by Steven Wilson.

Track listing

Band
 Colin Edwin – bass guitar
 Chris Maitland – drums
 Steven Wilson – guitar, keyboards, samples

Guest musicians
 Markus Butler – harmonica
 Rick Edwards – percussion

References

Porcupine Tree albums
2001 albums